"Pretty in Pink" is a song by the English band the Psychedelic Furs, originally released in 1981 as a single from the band's second album, Talk Talk Talk. The 1986 film was named after the song and a re-recorded version of the song was included on its soundtrack.

Composition

Lead singer Richard Butler said "Pretty in Pink" is about two women he knew while living in Muswell Hill in north London. One was a friend of his ex-girlfriend, and the other went to a pub he frequented. However, the Caroline mentioned in the lyrics is a made-up name, and the girls are not high-school age, despite the film that was named after it causing some people to think so. "The song is about a girl who sleeps around a lot and thinks that she's popular because of it. It makes her feel empowered somehow and popular, and in fact, the people that she's sleeping with are laughing about her behind her back and talking about her," said Butler.

Release and reception
The original version of "Pretty in Pink" peaked at No. 43 on the UK Singles Chart in July 1981.
AllMusic writer Bill Janovitz credited producer Steve Lillywhite for finding "the ideal sound for the band, with a perfect blend of classic pop, punk, and art rock elements".
Janovitz called it "the definitive take" of the song.

The 1986 version reached No. 18 in the UK
and narrowly missed the Top 40 on the United States Billboard Hot 100 chart, peaking at No. 41.

Track listing
7" vinyl (1981)
"Pretty in Pink" - 3:57
"Mack the Knife" - 4:18

12" vinyl (1981)
"Pretty in Pink" - 3:57
"Mack the Knife" - 4:18
"Soap Commercial" - 2:55

7" vinyl (1986) [UK, Japan]
"Pretty in Pink" - 3:53
"Love My Way" (US remix) - 3:38

7" vinyl (1986) [U.S., Europe]
"Pretty in Pink" - 4:01
"Pretty in Pink" (dub) - 3:21

12" vinyl (1986)
"Pretty in Pink" - 4:01
"Pretty in Pink" - 3:21
"Love My Way" (US remix) - 3:38

Chart performance

References

1981 singles
1986 singles
The Psychedelic Furs songs
Song recordings produced by Steve Lillywhite
1981 songs
Columbia Records singles
Songs written by Tim Butler
Songs written by John Ashton (musician)
Songs written by Richard Butler (singer)
Music videos directed by Wayne Isham
Songs about bullying